Kari Korhonen (born 1973) is a Finnish cartoonist known for his stories about Donald Duck.

Korhonen has been drawing Disney comics for the Danish publisher Egmont Group since 1993, where he is most known for his work on Donald Duck stories and Winnie the Pooh. Apart from his work at Disney characters he is also known as a commercial illustrator for magazines and children's books. In 2011 Korhonen wrote and drew the first Angry Birds comic.

References

External links
 
 Kari Korhonen at the Lambiek Comiclopedia

1973 births
Disney comics artists
Finnish comics artists
Finnish comics writers
Living people